The 2003 Portland Timbers season was the 3rd season for the Portland Timbers—the 3rd incarnation of a club to bear the Timbers name—of the now-defunct A-League, the second-tier league of the United States and Canada at the time.

Preseason

Canterbury Cup

Regular season

May

June

July

August

Competitions

A-League

Western Conference, Pacific Division standings

Results summary

Results by round

Club 
<div style="float:left; width:47%;">

Coaching staff

Top scorers
Players with 1 goal or more included only.

Disciplinary record 
Players with 1 card or more included only.

Goalkeeper stats 
All goalkeepers included.

Player movement

Transfers in

Loans in

Transfers out

Loans out

Unsigned draft picks

Notes
^  The United Soccer Leagues took over operations of the Calgary Storm following financial troubles by the ownership group and the team finished the season as Team Calgary.
 On February 14, it was announced that a tentative deal had been reached with the City of Portland in which Portland Family Entertainment (PFE) would be dissolved and a new group, Metropolitan Sports (a subset of PFE investors), would take over ownership of the Timbers and the Portland Beavers baseball club. The Timbers referred to Metropolitan Sports as the owner throughout much of the 2003 season. However, Metropolitan Sports was not able to secure the required funding and the deal was never completed.

References

2003 in Portland, Oregon
2003
American soccer clubs 2003 season
2003 in sports in Oregon